Cyril Alfred "Jerry" Skinner (1908 —21 December 1961) was an Australian rugby league player.

He played one season with the St. George Dragons in 1932. He played 3 third grade games, 9 reserve grade games and one first grade game on 6 August 1932.

Skinner died in Penshurst, New South Wales on 21 December 1961.

References

1908 births
1961 deaths
St. George Dragons players
Australian rugby league players
Rugby league halfbacks